Golf Australia support elite male and female amateurs golfers through the Australian National Squad. Golf Australia also runs a Rookie Program assisting professional golfers as they enter their professional careers.

Notable members
Australian National Squad members have included Geoff Ogilvy, Karrie Webb, Adam Scott, Aaron Baddeley, Michael Sim and Katherine Hull.

See also
 Australian Open
 Women's Australian Open
 Australian Amateur
 Australian Women's Amateur
 Australian Boys' Amateur

External links
List of current Golf Australia National Squad members
List of current Golf Australia Rookie Program members
Golf Australia website

Golf in Australia
National sports teams of Australia